Kanda refers to two separate surnames, one in Japanese and one which is common in Zimbabwe. Notable people with the surname include:

Japanese surname
Sayaka Kanda (1986-2021), Japanese singer, and daughter of Masaki and Seiko Matsuda
, Japanese anime director
, Japanese shogi player
Uno Kanda (born 1975), Japanese model, actress, and TV talent
Yasushi Kanda (born 1978), Japanese professional wrestler
, Japanese footballer

Zimbabwean surname
Mathias Kanda (1942–2009), Zimbabwean marathon runner

Fictional characters
Sorata Kanda, protagonist of the light novel series The Pet Girl of Sakurasou
Yu Kanda, a character in the manga series D.Gray-man

Japanese-language surnames